The Tenetehára or Teneteharan languages (also known as Tupi–Guarani IV) are a subgroup of the Tupi–Guarani language family.

Along with Timbira and the Northern Tupi–Guarani languages, the Tenetehara languages form part of the lower Tocantins-Mearim linguistic area.

Languages
The Tenetehara languages are:

Akwáwa (dialects: Asuriní, Suruí do Pará, Parakanã)
Avá-Canoeiro
Tapirapé
Tenetehára (dialects: Guajajara, Tembé)
Turiwára

References